William O'Shea (6 August 1906 – 11 March 1997) was an Irish boxer. He competed in the men's lightweight event at the 1928 Summer Olympics.

References

External links
 

1906 births
1997 deaths
Irish male boxers
Olympic boxers of Ireland
Boxers at the 1928 Summer Olympics
Place of birth missing
Lightweight boxers